Ostia (officially Lido di Ostia) is a large neighbourhood in the X Municipio of the comune of Rome, Italy, near the ancient port of Rome, which is now a major archaeological site known as Ostia Antica. Ostia is also the only  or district of Rome on the Tyrrhenian Sea, and many Romans spend the summer holidays there.

History 
Ostia Antica had been the port city of ancient Rome, and is often referenced in writings from the times of the Roman Republic and the Roman Empire. For Christian posterity, Ostia Antica was especially important as  the site of the death of Saint Monica (mother of Saint Augustine) in 387 in a house property of the Diocesi of Rome, on their way back to Africa after Augustine's conversion to Christianity.

An important stand in Italian nationalism of the 19th century was a veneration for the glories of the Roman past, manifested in a wish to revive or recreate various places and institutions connected with Ancient Rome. In 1871, the city of Rome became the capital of the new Kingdom of Italy. A recreation of Ostia was an obvious additional step.

The modern neighbourhood of Ostia was founded in 1884, near the remains of Ostia Antica. This was possible after reclamation of the nearby marshland, which was infested by malarial mosquitos. The first inhabitants were peasants coming from Ravenna, in Romagna. Due to the opening of the urban Roma–Ostia railway in 1924, the new village soon became the favourite sea resort of the Romans, while many Art Nouveau houses were built on the waterfront.

The new village was connected to central Rome through the new Via Ostiense, which was opened in 1907. During the Fascist period, the government massively expanded the neighbourhood, which got its ultimate architectural character due to many new buildings in Stile Littorio. New infrastructure, such as a second road to Rome (Via del Mare'), the promenade, and a water airport, were all built during this period.

After World War II, many bathing establishments were built on the seaside, and Ostia experienced a tourist boom. The new  Cristoforo Colombo Avenue connected Ostia with the EUR district in Rome. Sea pollution, which became apparent during the 1970s, lowered the popularity of Ostia as a sea resort.

The building of the Leonardo da Vinci Airport in Fiumicino in 1956 made Ostia an attractive district for airport and airline workers. Italian intellectual, film director and poet Pier Paolo Pasolini was assassinated near the water aerodrome on 2 November 1975. In 1976, Ostia became part of the X Municipio of the comune of Rome. Nowadays, due to the expansion of the city, only the Park of Castelfusano separates Ostia from the other quarters of Rome.

Geography 
The town is located on the Tyrrhenian coast, close to Acilia and separated from Fiumicino by the mouth of the Tiber. Located on the coast, Ostia enjoys warmer winters and cooler summers than central Rome.

Transportation 
The regional Rome–Lido railway, which carries over 90,000 passengers a day, connects Ostia to the centre of Rome, providing up to 12 journeys per hour during rush hour. It has 13 stops, and the journey time is roughly 37 minutes. The Roman terminal is at Roma Porta San Paolo station, very close to the Piramide stop (Rome Metro, Line B) and close to Roma Ostiense railway station.

Rail stops in Ostia are Ostia Antica, Ostia Lido Nord, Ostia Lido Centro, Ostia Stella Polare, Ostia Castel Fusano and Ostia Cristoforo Colombo.

References

External links 
 
 

 
Coastal towns in Lazio
Subdivisions of Rome